Hetkhamar is a village in Debagarh district, Odisha, about 35 kilometers from the district headquarters Debagarh.

Geography 
The village is located south of the Asian Highway 46, near the Gohira Dam, and north of the Deogarh Forest Range.

Demography 
The total population of the village was approximately 700 in the 2011 census.

Education 
The village has a primary school.

Festivals and culture 
The village celebrates an annual festival on the eve of Bali Jatra, followed by Kartik Purnima. Holi, New year, and Raja are the other significant festivals organised in the village.

References

Villages in Debagarh district